Edwards County Courthouse is located in the center of downtown Rocksprings, Texas.  The Courthouse was built by architects Ben Davey and Bruno Schort in the Romanesque Revival Style. It is listed by the Texas Historical Society as a historical structure.

See also

National Register of Historic Places listings in Edwards County, Texas
Recorded Texas Historic Landmarks in Edwards County
List of county courthouses in Texas

References

External links

Courthouses on the National Register of Historic Places in Texas
National Register of Historic Places in Edwards County, Texas